Villasitocoris is a genus of leaf-footed bugs in the family Coreidae. There is one described species in Villasitocoris, V. inconspicuus.

References

Further reading

 

Articles created by Qbugbot
Coreini
Coreidae genera